Staranzano is a comune (municipality) in the Province of Gorizia in the Italian region Friuli-Venezia Giulia, located about  northwest of Trieste and about  southwest of Gorizia.

The municipality of Staranzano contains the frazioni (subdivisions, mainly villages and hamlets) Alberoni, Bistrigna, Dobbia, Lido di Staranzano, Quarantia, Villaraspa, Le Coloschie, Bosco Grande, Bonifica del Broncolo and Punta Sdobba.

Staranzano borders the following municipalities: Grado, Monfalcone, Ronchi dei Legionari, San Canzian d'Isonzo.

Demographic evolution

References

External links
 www.comunedistaranzano.it/

Cities and towns in Friuli-Venezia Giulia